Petar Kurumbashev is a Bulgarian politician who served as a Member of European Parliament from 2014 to 2019 from the Bulgaria constituency.

References 

MEPs for Bulgaria 2014–2019
Year of birth missing (living people)
Living people